Ccolcce (possibly from Aymara and Quechua for silver, money) or Jolje Cruz (Spanish cruz cross, "silver cross") is a mountain in the Vilcanota mountain range in the Andes of Peru, about  high. It is located in the Cusco Region, Quispicanchi Province, Marcapata District. Ccolcce lies north to northwest of Yanajasa and Kiswarniyuq. It is situated between the rivers Sayapata and Cajamayu (possibly from Quechua for "rock river"). They flow to Arasa River (Araza) in the north.

References

Mountains of Cusco Region
Mountains of Peru